Gladys Maxine "Skeeter" Werner Walker (December 22, 1933 – July 20, 2001) was an alpine ski racer and Olympian from the United States.

Biography 
Born and raised in Steamboat Springs, Colorado, "Skeeter" Werner learned to ski and race at Howelsen Hill. An alternate for the 1952 Olympic team, she was youngest member of the U.S. Ski Team at the 1954 World Championships and the U.S. Olympic team in 1956. Werner retired from competition in 1958, and modeled and designed fashions in New York. She returned to Steamboat Springs in 1962 and opened a ski shop with her younger brothers Wallace ("Buddy" 1936–64) and Loris ("Bugs" b.1941), also Olympians. She later founded the Steamboat Ski School.

In 1966, one of her ski school students was Doak Walker, a famous NFL running back (and winner of the Heisman Trophy in 1948). They eloped in 1969 to Las Vegas and lived together in Steamboat Springs for the rest of their lives. He died in 1998 at age 71, eight months after a ski accident left him paralyzed. She died of cancer in July 2001, at age 67.

References

External links
  
 Colorado Ski & Snowboard Museum Hall of Fame – Gladys Werner-Walker
 Colorado Ski Hall of Fame – Gladys "Skeeter" Werner Walker
Sports Illustrated -  Skeeter tunes up (cover story) - November 21, 1955
 Walk of Olympians
 

1933 births
2001 deaths
American female alpine skiers
Olympic alpine skiers of the United States
Alpine skiers at the 1956 Winter Olympics
20th-century American women